Topacio Fresh  (born 26 December 1973 Rosario, Argentina) is an Argentine singer, actress, dancer, art gallerist, and activist based in Spain since 2002. She is known for her participation as a dancer of the Fangoria group, for her art gallery in Madrid and for her work as an actress. in the movie Witching & Bitching.

Life 
She was born on 26 December 1973. Since she was very young she became interested in contemporary art, taking courses and seminars focused mainly on video art, art criticism and "performance".

Her relationship with Spain began in 2002, where she was chosen to participate in an Argentine-Spanish cultural exchange involving the EGO art center and the Labor University of Gijón. Later she was selected to participate in the international exhibition called "Globos Sonda" held at the MUSAC (Contemporary Museum of Castilla y León) under the direction of Rafael Doctor.

From that moment, she began her collaboration with the Spanish musical group "Fangoria", first to participate in the video directed by Martín Sastre "The hand in the fire" and later to be performance of the group formed by Alaska and Nacho Canut.

In 2008, together with her husband, Israel Cotes, she embarked on her new project, the opening of a new gallery space in Madrid: La Fresh Gallery, taking the role of partner and artistic director. She made the first exhibitions of young artists, such as Alberto de las Heras or Nacho Torra, and she managed to ensure that already established artists participated for the first time in the gallery circuit, as is the case of Juan Gatti, or Fabio McNamara.

La Fresh Gallery is currently considered a hub for the meeting of artists, musicians, filmmakers, celebrities and representatives of the cultural world and of Spanish "entertainment", turning their already famous openings into a social event.

One of her curatorial works has been the exhibition "BIG" (2014), commemorating the 5th anniversary of La Fresh Gallery, where she brought together the artists: Juan Gatti, Fabio McNamara, Gorka Postigo, Rubenimichi, Alberto de las Heras , Gabriela Bettini, Nacho Torra and Brian Kenny. It was one of the most visited exhibitions of the national gallery circuit.

She began to collaborate actively in several television programs and graphic media, being the starting point the "reality" broadcast by the MTV network, "Alaska and Mario", and specific appearances in the cinema, as in the movie of Álex de la Iglesia (Witching & Bitching) where she plays a witch in a small cameo.

In 2018, she appeared in Dancing with the Stars.

Film 

 (2013): Las brujas de Zugarramurdi

Television

Music 

 (2006): El extraño viaje (Fangoria)
 (2007): Leopardo No Viaja (Leopardo No Viaja)....

References

External links 

 Official webpage
 La Fresh Gallery
 Fan Page 
"Mis padres aceptaron que fuera transexual cuando me casé", SER

Argentine film actresses
Argentine television actresses
Transgender actresses
Transgender singers
Transgender women musicians
21st-century Argentine women singers
Argentine expatriates in Spain
1973 births
Argentine LGBT musicians
Argentine LGBT actors
Argentine transgender people
Living people